Abhimanyu Rajp (born 8 March 1986) is an Indian born American cricketer. Rajp is a right-arm off-spin bowler and a right handed batsman. Rajp currently represents the United States national cricket team.

Career

Early years
Rajp was born in Ludhiana, Punjab, India. Along with being primarily a right-handed off-spinner he is also a handy batsman. He started playing cricket professionally at an early age and represented his city Ludhiana at the U-14 and U-16 district levels. Later, Rajp, who was 14 at the time, along with his family moved to the United States of America in the year 2000. Rajp, quickly took over the Under-19 cricket scene in the US and became one of the All-stars of the country by 2004. Soon after, he was labelled as one to watch for the future by various critics in the USA cricket circuit.

Under-19 career
Rajp captained the Southern California Cricket Association's Under-19 team from its creation in 2002 until 2006. He was also the captain of USA's South West Region Under-19 team from 2004 to 2006, which participates in the annual USA National Under-19 Tournaments. He was part of the first generation of USA cricketers in the Under-19 structure of USA that started with the first Under-19 National Tournament in 2004. Rajp went on to make the national under-19 team in 2005.

Rajp first represented the United States national cricket team at the ICC Americas Under-19 Championship in 2005 against Canada, Bermuda, Cayman Islands and Argentina. Rajp was particularly successful against Bermuda, taking 5 for 7, due to which Bermuda was all out for a rather small target of 87 and USA coasted to victory by eight wickets. The very next day, Rajp took another five-for (5 for 45), against Argentina in a seven-wicket victory before USA registered its final victory of the tour against Cayman Islands to seal a sweep of the tournament and made history by clinching a spot in the 2006 ICC Under-19 Cricket World Cup for the first time, in Sri Lanka. At that tournament, Rajp became the first American cricketer to become the MVP of any U-19 tournament involving USA. He grabbed the best bowler of the tournament and two man of the match awards. Rajp ended the tournament with a tournament-high 11 wickets in four games and marked his arrival.

Rajp's first major test came in the form of the 2006 ICC Under-19 Cricket World Cup in Sri Lanka, in which he was promoted to be the vice-captain of the United States Under-19 cricket team due to his performances at the ICC Americas Under-19 Championship and National Under-19 Tournaments. He had a successful World Cup campaign and finished the tournament as one of the leading wicket takers for the US and also landed himself in the top 10 wicket takers for the entire tournament, in number of wickets taken. His most notable performance came against an ICC full-member nation, New Zealand, when he took the first (and the only until date) five-wicket haul for the USA against a full member nation. United States of America Cricket Association's administration problems soon after the 2006 ICC Under-19 Cricket World Cup resulted in a two-year ban imposed by cricket's governing body, International Cricket Council. Rajp's name slowly faded away on the national circuit and was off the radar for the next few years before making his resurgence in 2010.

USA Domestic Cricket
Rajp has been one of the top players in the USA domestic cricket circuit for a number of years. He plays in the Southern California Cricket Association, which is based in Los Angeles, California and represents the South West Region in USA National Cricket Tournaments. He has had a good showing in domestic tournaments with the most recent being the best bowler at the 2010 Western Conference, where he also created a national level record, which stands until date, for taking 7 wickets in one innings, at a national tournament game against the Central East region. Later he went on to become the best bowler for the second time in a calendar year and this time it was at the 2010 United States Senior National tournament. Following solid domestic performances, and a good Under-19 record at the highest level, Rajp, was called for national trials in 2012 to earn a spot in the United States national cricket team. He would later go one to make the USA National Squad in 2012.

In June 2021, he was selected to take part in the Minor League Cricket tournament in the United States following the players' draft.

International career
Rajp made his debut in 2012 when he was selected as to be a part of the United States national cricket team at the 2012 ICC World Twenty20 Qualifier in the UAE in March 2012. He debuted in style against Italy when he took a wicket with his very first delivery and scored an unbeaten 14 runs off 9 balls in a match that USA lost by 8 runs.
Rajp had a very successful debut tournament, finishing at the top in the wickets department for his team and in the top ten on the list of highest wicket takers for the entire tournament (in number of wickets taken). Following his performances with the ball he was also the one of the best fielder in his team, with team high 6 catches, and finished the tournament in the Top Three (in amount of fielding dismissals).

Awarding his success at the 2012 ICC World Twenty20 Qualifier, his debut tour for the Senior national team, the selectors picked Rajp as one of the members of the United States national cricket team for the 2012 ICC World Cricket League Division Four which took place from 3 to 10 September 2012 in Malaysia. The United States national cricket team was successful in gaining promotion to 2013 ICC World Cricket League Division Three to be held in Bermuda from 28 April to 5 May 2013. Rajp, who once again finished as one of the top wicket takers for USA in the Twenty20 however, was not chosen to be a part of that team traveling to Bermuda for Division Three, 50 over format, Following a spree of changes in the USA Squad after the team's successful triumph in the 2013 ICC World Cricket League Americas Region Twenty20 Division One where USA swept the whole tournament to gain qualification for the 2013 ICC World Twenty20 Qualifier in the UAE. Rajp again finished as one of the top wicket takes for USA in that tournament as well.

Later in 2013, Rajp traveled with the USA Squad to Toronto, Canada for the 2013 edition of the Auty Cup (annual fixture vs Canada) and was hailed by critics as one of the stand out performers for the USA. Although, his aggressive bowling as not enough for the US to win the Auty Cup title, it surely helped his case to become a regular fixture in the USA squad.

See also 
ICC Americas Under-19 Championship
2006 ICC Under-19 Cricket World Cup
2012 ICC World Twenty20 Qualifier
2012 ICC World Cricket League Division Four
2013 ICC World Cricket League Division Three

References

External links
Abhimanyu Rajp at Cricinfo
Abhimanyu Rajp at CricketArchive

1986 births
Living people
People from Punjab, India
American cricketers
American sportspeople of Indian descent